The Beardmore Glacier in Antarctica is one of the largest valley glaciers in the world, being  long and having a width of .

The glacier is one of the main passages through the Transantarctic Mountains to the great polar plateau beyond, and was one of the early routes to the South Pole despite its steep upward incline.

The glacier was discovered and climbed by Ernest Shackleton during his Nimrod Expedition of 1908. Although Shackleton turned back at latitude 88° 23' S, just  from the South Pole, he established the first proven route towards the pole and, in doing so, became the first person to set foot upon the polar plateau. In 1911–1912, Captain Scott and his Terra Nova Expedition team reached the South Pole by similarly climbing the Beardmore. However, they reached the pole a month after Roald Amundsen and his team, who had chosen a route up the previously unknown Axel Heiberg Glacier. It was on the way back to the Nova expedition's base camp after they left the South Pole that Edgar Evans, one of the members of Scott's chosen team to go on to the final trek to the South Pole, died around the foot of Beardmore Glacier on February 17, 1912.

Beardmore Glacier was named by Shackleton after Sir William Beardmore, a Scottish industrialist and expedition sponsor. However, Ranulph Fiennes writes that Shackleton had previously told Beardmore's wife, Elspeth, that he would name a glacier after her and it is possible that is what Shackleton actually did.

In 2016, the first beetle fossils, in the form of wing-cases (elytra) of the ground beetle Antarctotrechus, around 14 to 20 million years old, were found in sediments adjacent to the glacier.

See also 
 List of glaciers in the Antarctic
 Glaciology
 Wild Icefalls

References 

Glaciers of Shackleton Coast
Glaciers of Dufek Coast